Frederick Ernest "Ernie" Clark (25 March 1898 – September 1993) was a British track and field athlete. He was born in Morden and known for competing in racewalking of the 1924 Summer Olympics. In 1924, he finished sixth in the 10 km competition at the Paris Olympics.

References

Sources
Ernie Clark. Sports Reference. Retrieved on 2015-01-21.

External links
 

1898 births
1993 deaths
British male racewalkers
Olympic athletes of Great Britain
Athletes (track and field) at the 1924 Summer Olympics
Athletes from London
English male racewalkers